Krista Aru (born 1 August 1958 in Pagari village, Ida-Viru County) is an Estonian historian of journalism, museologist, politician. She has been member of XIII Riigikogu.

In 1981 she graduated from Tartu University in journalism. In 2010 she finished her doctoral studies in Tallinn University.

From 1995 to 2005 she was the director of Estonian Literary Museum. From 2006 to 2012 she was the director of Estonian National Museum.

She has been an unaffiliated member of the Estonian Free Party.

Awards
 2000: Order of the White Star, Class III
 2005: Cultural Endowment of Estonia Annual Award
 2012: Citizen of the Year
 2018: Baltic Assembly Medal

References

Living people
1958 births
20th-century Estonian historians
21st-century Estonian historians
Members of the Riigikogu, 2015–2019
Women members of the Riigikogu
University of Tartu alumni
Tallinn University alumni
Recipients of the Order of the White Star, 3rd Class
People from Alutaguse Parish
Estonian women historians
Estonian women journalists
21st-century Estonian women politicians